The 7th British Academy Video Game Awards (known for the purposes of sponsorship as GAME British Academy Video Games Awards) awarded by the British Academy of Film and Television Arts, was an award ceremony held on 16 March 2011 in the London Hilton. The ceremony honoured achievement in video gaming in 2010 and was hosted by Dara Ó Briain. Heavy Rain was the major winner on the night, taking three of the seven awards available.

Winners and nominees
Winners are shown first in bold.

Academy Fellowship
 Peter Molyneux

Games with multiple nominations and wins

Nominations

Wins

External links
7th BAFTA Video Games Awards page

British Academy Games Awards ceremonies
2011 awards in the United Kingdom
2010 in video gaming
March 2011 events in the United Kingdom